Antonio Manuel 'Manu' Sánchez Gómez (born 25 January 1979) is a Spanish retired footballer who played as a central midfielder.

Club career
Sánchez was born in Fuengirola, Province of Málaga. He came through the ranks of Real Madrid but never made it past the reserves; he was however included in their squad for the 2000 FIFA Club World Championship. He joined local Málaga CF in January 2002, being relatively used over five and a half seasons.

Manu's best output came in the 2002–03 campaign, with six La Liga goals in 36 appearances – including a brace against Athletic Bilbao on 9 March 2003 for a 3–0 home win– with Málaga finishing 13th. Previously, he had helped the Andalusia team to reach the UEFA Cup via success in the Intertoto Cup.

In the summer of 2007, after having appeared in only three Segunda División games during the season due to contractual problems, Sánchez signed with Hércules CF in the same league, being released at the end of the campaign after playing just ten out of a possible 42 matches. In early 2009 he joined lowly Antequera CF in a return to his native region, with the club being eventually relegated to Tercera División.

Honours
Málaga
UEFA Intertoto Cup: 2002

References

External links

1979 births
Living people
People from Fuengirola
Sportspeople from the Province of Málaga
Spanish footballers
Footballers from Andalusia
Association football midfielders
La Liga players
Segunda División players
Segunda División B players
Real Madrid C footballers
Real Madrid Castilla footballers
Málaga CF players
Hércules CF players
Antequera CF footballers
Spain youth international footballers